Ideal Colony is a Pune Metro station in Pune, India. The station was opened on 6 March 2022 as an inauguration of Pune Metro and was the first to be completed.Currently Aqua Line is operational between Vanaz and Garware College.

Station Layout

References

Pune Metro stations
Railway stations in India opened in 2022